Ludwig Josef Georg Bieler (20 October 1906 – 2 May 1981) was an Austrian-born scholar of Hiberno-Latin. He immigrated to the United States in 1939 and became a professor at various universities there.

References 
https://www.dib.ie/biography/bieler-ludwig-josef-georg-a0651

Corresponding Fellows of the British Academy
Emigrants from Austria to the United States after the Anschluss
1906 births
1981 deaths